Venia is an unincorporated community in Buchanan County, Virginia, in the United States.

History
A post office was established at Venia in 1923, and remained in operation until it was discontinued in 1965. Venia Buchanan was an early postmaster.

References

Unincorporated communities in Buchanan County, Virginia
Unincorporated communities in Virginia